Margalida Castro (born 19 November 1943) is a Colombian theatre and television actress.

Biography
Born in San Gil, Santander, Castro grew up in Bogotá and studied music as a child. She entered Universidad Nacional de Colombia to study architecture; she also studied flute and was part of the university's orchestra, but she dropped her studies after meeting playwright Carlos Perozzo, with whom she would be married for six years. Her debut on Colombian television would be on the 1967 series La tercera palabra, directed by Bernardo Romero Lozano. Ever since she would appear in dozens of theatre plays and Colombian telenovelas and television series.

Selected filmography 
El secretario (Caracol TV, 2011) as Gertrudis Dudis Buenahora
Chepe Fortuna (RCN TV, 2010) as Úrsula
Victoria (RTI / TELEMUNDO, 2007) as Mercedes "Memé" de Santiesteban
La Tormenta (RTI / Caracol TV / Telemundo, 2005) as María Teresa Marrero "La Sibila"
La viuda de la mafia (RCN TV, 2005)
La venganza (RTI / Caracol TV / Telemundo, 2002)
Luzbel está de visita (RTI / Caracol TV, 2001)
A dónde va Soledad (Tevecine / RCN TV, 2000)
Yo amo a Paquita Gallego (RTI / Canal A, 1998) as María Isabel Vargas aka tía Chavela
María bonita (RTI Colombia / Cadena Uno, 1996)
Solo una mujer (Caracol TV / Cadena Uno, 1995)
Caballo viejo (Caracol TV / Cadena 2, 1988) as La sietelenguas
Gallito Ramírez (1986) as Sussy Borda Lavalle)
El taxista millonario (film, 1979)
Yo y tú (Canal Nacional, 1968) as Gringa Peggy
'' master chef celebrity colombia

External links 
 Colarte

1943 births
Colombian actresses
Colombian television actresses
Living people